Kirtley Baker (June 24, 1869 – April 15, 1927) was a pitcher in Major League Baseball. He played for the Baltimore Orioles, Pittsburgh Alleghenys (now Pirates), and Washington Senators.

External links

1869 births
1927 deaths
19th-century baseball players
Aurora Maroons players
Baltimore Orioles (NL) players
Baseball players from Indiana
Chattanooga Chatts players
Columbus Senators players
Major League Baseball pitchers
Ottumwa Coal Palaces players
Milwaukee Brewers (minor league) players
Milwaukee Creams players
Minneapolis Millers (baseball) players
New Orleans Pelicans (baseball) players
People from Aurora, Indiana
Pittsburgh Pirates players
Quincy Black Birds players
Springfield Ponies players
Springfield Maroons players
Toronto Canucks players
Washington Senators (1891–1899) players